Carissa Turner (born 6 August 1989) is a Welsh badminton and Australian rules football player. 

In her badminton career she achieved 42 Welsh Caps, 13 Welsh National Badminton Championship titles, 3 International Titles and represented Wales at the Commonwealth Games Delhi 2010 and Glasgow 2014.

In Australian Football she has 9 Welsh Caps and 5 GB Caps, represents Cardiff Panthers in the Wales & England Women's 9s League while also representing West London Wildcats in the AFL London 18 a-side league. She was part of the South Wales Universities team that finished as minor premiers in the 2020 AFL England National University League.

Badminton Achievements

BWF International Challenge/Series 
Women's singles

Women's doubles

  BWF International Challenge tournament
  BWF International Series tournament
  BWF Future Series tournament

Welsh National Titles

Women's Singles Titles; 2013, 2014, 2015.

Women's Doubles Titles; partner Caroline Harvey 2010 - partner Sarah Thomas 2012, 2013, 2014, 2015, 2016, 2017 - partner Gean Sou Mo 2018 - partner Amy Whiteman 2019

Mixed Doubles Titles; partner Will Kitching 2019

Australian Football Achievements 
9 Welsh Caps representing Wales at Euro Cup 2018 and 2019.

5 Caps for Great Britain at the European Championships 2019.

Selected to represent Great Britain at the International Cup 2020 (cancelled due to Covid-19 Pandemic).

Cardiff Panthers awards; Most Improved 2019, Player's Player 2021.

West London Wildcats award; Women's Premiership's Best International Player 2021.

Other 
Tunstall Healthcare UK Internal Workplace Awards:

Best Lip Sync Battle 2021 for performance of Agadoo with the Training Team's group "Lack Pace".

Tunstall Triathlete Top Banana Award, April 2022.

References

External links 
 

1989 births
Living people
Sportspeople from Cardiff
Welsh female badminton players
Commonwealth Games competitors for Wales
Badminton players at the 2014 Commonwealth Games
Badminton players at the 2010 Commonwealth Games
Welsh players of Australian rules football